Kura Bolagh or Kurabolagh may refer to:
 Kura Bolagh, East Azerbaijan
 Kura Bolagh, Chaypareh, West Azerbaijan Province
 Kura Bolagh, Showt, West Azerbaijan Province

See also
 Kur Bolagh (disambiguation)